Top o' the Morning / Emperor Waltz is a Decca Records studio album of phonograph records by Bing Crosby of songs from his movies Top o' the Morning and The Emperor Waltz, catalog number DL 5272.

Background
Bing Crosby had recorded the songs from his film Top o' the Morning in May and June 1949 and these were released on two separate 78 records to tie in with the film’s premiere on August 31, 1949.  Following the development of the vinyl LP record by Columbia Records in 1948, Decca issued a plethora of Crosby albums in that format. Many were simply reissues of earlier 78rpm albums but Top o' the Morning / Emperor Waltz appears to be the first 10" LP not to have been issued as a 78rpm album. As the four songs from Top o' the Morning only filled one side of the LP, Decca added the four songs from the successful Bing Crosby – The Emperor Waltz 78 rpm album to complete the record.

Reception
Billboard reviewed the songs from “Top o’ the Morning” when they were issued as singles saying:

Oh, ‘Tis Sweet to Think
Bing and the fem lead from “Top o’ the Morning” do an art song—lyrics by Thomas Moore—charmingly. Not for the masses.
The Donovans
More from the score—and as Irish as Barry Fitzgerald’s phiz. Special stuff—may appeal in the Gaelic nabes.
You’re in Love with Someone
A Burke-Van Heusen pop from “Top o’ the Morning” gets the tender treatment from Bing.
Top o’ the Morning
Irish and quaint as all get-out is the title tune, a small lesson in Gaelic a la Berlitz.

Track listing
Recording dates follow song titles.

References 

Bing Crosby albums
Decca Records albums
1950 albums